Adolph Zang Mansion is a historic house located at 709 Clarkson Street in Denver, Colorado.

Description and history 
Built in 1903, it was designed by Denver architect Frederick C. Eberley. Architecturally, the three and a half story house is Neoclassical Revival. It was built for Adolph J. Zang, son of Philip Zang the founder of Zang Brewery. The interior includes gilded ceilings, five fireplaces, Tiffany chandeliers, handcarved woodwork and a stained-glass window scene from Shakespeare’s Merchant of Venice.

It was listed on the National Register of Historic Places on November 23, 1977.

In 2017, the mansion was sold for 2 million dollars.

See also
Adolph J. Zang House, also NRHP-listed in Denver

References

Houses on the National Register of Historic Places in Colorado
Neoclassical architecture in Colorado
Houses completed in 1880
Houses in Denver
National Register of Historic Places in Denver